Rhymes is a surname. In Newfoundland, it may be a variant spelling of Reims, a city in France.

People with this surname include:
Buster Rhymes (born 1962), American football player
Will Rhymes (born 1983), American baseball player
Raph Rhymes (born 1989), American baseball player

See also

References